Pineapple Express is a non-technical term for a meteorological phenomenon, a specific recurring atmospheric river characterized by a strong and persistent large-scale flow of warm moist air, and the associated heavy precipitation both in the waters immediately northeast of the Hawaiian Islands and extending northeast to any location along the Pacific coast of North America. A Pineapple Express is an example of an atmospheric river, which is a more general term for such relatively narrow corridors of enhanced water vapor transport at mid-latitudes around the world.

Causes and effects

A Pineapple Express is driven by a strong, southern branch of the polar jet stream and is marked by the presence of a surface frontal boundary which is typically either slow or stationary, with waves of low pressure traveling along its length. Each of these low-pressure systems brings enhanced rainfall.

The conditions are often created by the Madden–Julian oscillation, an equatorial rainfall pattern which feeds its moisture into this pattern. They are also present during an El Niño episode.

The combination of moisture-laden air, atmospheric dynamics, and orographic enhancement resulting from the passage of this air over the mountain ranges of the western coast of North America causes some of the most torrential rains to occur in the region. Pineapple Express systems typically generate heavy snowfall in the mountains and Interior Plateau, which often melts rapidly because of the warming effect of the system. After being drained of their moisture, the tropical air masses reach the inland prairies as a Chinook wind or simply "a Chinook", a term which is also synonymous in the Pacific Northwest with the Pineapple Express.

Extreme cases

Many Pineapple Express events follow or occur simultaneously with major arctic troughs in the northwestern United States, often leading to major snow-melt flooding with warm, tropical rains falling on frozen, snow laden ground. Examples of this are the Christmas flood of 1964, Willamette Valley flood of 1996, New Year's Day Flood of 1997, January 2006 Flood in Northern California and Nevada, Great Coastal Gale of 2007, January 2008 Flood in Nevada, January 2009 Flood in Washington, the January 2012 Flood in Oregon, the 2019 Valentine's Day Flood in Southern California, and the February 2020 floods in Oregon and Washington.

West coast, 1862
Early in 1862, extreme storms riding the Pineapple Express battered the west coast for 45 days. In addition to a sudden snow melt, some places received an estimated  of rain, leading to the worst flooding in recorded history of California, Oregon, and Nevada, known as the Great Flood of 1862. Both the Sacramento and San Joaquin valleys flooded, and there was extensive flooding and mudslides throughout the region.

Northern California, 1952
The San Francisco Bay Area is another locale along the Pacific Coast which is occasionally affected by a Pineapple Express. When it visits, the heavy, persistent rainfall typically causes flooding of local streams as well as urban flooding. In the decades before about 1980, the local term for a Pineapple Express was "Hawaiian Storm". During the second week of January 1952, a series of "Hawaiian" storms swept into Northern California, causing widespread flooding around the Bay Area.

The same storms brought a blizzard of heavy, wet snow to the Sierra Nevada Mountains, notoriously stranding the train City of San Francisco on January 13.

Northern California, 1955
The greatest flooding in Northern California since the 1800s occurred in 1955 as a result of a series of Hawaiian storms, with the greatest damage in the Sacramento Valley around Yuba City.

Southern California, 2005

A Pineapple Express related storm battered Southern California from January 7–11, 2005. This storm was the largest to hit Southern California since the storms that hit during the 1997–98 El Niño event. In some areas the storm was followed by over a month of near-continuous rain.

Alaska, 2006
The unusually intense rainstorms that hit south-central Alaska in October 2006 were called "Pineapple Express" rains locally.

Pacific Northwest, 2006

The Puget Sound region from Olympia, Washington to Vancouver, British Columbia received several inches of rain per day in November 2006 from a series of successive Pineapple Express related storms that caused massive flooding in all major regional rivers and mudslides which closed the mountain passes.  These storms included heavy winds which are not usually associated with the phenomenon. Regional dams opened their spillways to 100% as they had reached capacity because of rain and snowmelt. Officials referred to the storm system as "the worst in a decade" on 8 November 2006. Portions of Oregon were also affected, including over 14 inches (350 mm) in one day at Lees Camp in the Coast Range, while the normally arid and sheltered Interior of British Columbia received heavy, coastal-magnitude rains.

Southern California, December 2010
Although the entire state was affected, the Southern California counties of San Bernardino, Orange, Riverside, San Diego, and Los Angeles bore the brunt of the system of storms, as coastal and hillside areas were impacted by mudslides and major flooding.

California, December 2014
In December 2014, a powerful winter storm enhanced by a Pineapple Express feature struck California, resulting in snow, wind, and flood watches. A blizzard warning was issued by the National Weather Service for the Northern Sierra Nevada for the first time in California since October 2009 and January 2008. The storm caused power outages for more than 50,000 people. It was thought to be the most powerful storm to impact California since the January 2010 California winter storms. A rare tornado touched down in Los Angeles on December 12.

West Coast, 2017

Historically strong storms associated with the Pineapple Express brought flooding and mudslides to California, particularly the San Francisco Bay Area, destroying homes and closing numerous roads, including State Route 17, State Route 35, State Route 37, Interstate 80, State Route 12, State Route 1, State Route 84, State Route 9 and State Route 152.

The storm brought major snow to the Sierra Nevada and San Gabriel Mountains. The storm also brought not only significant flooding to the Los Angeles area and most of southern California (killing about 3 people), but also significant severe weather in that area.

California, January 2021

A powerful winter storm channeled a Pineapple Express into California from January 26–29. One person was injured in one of the mudslides in Northern California, and many structures suffered damage. The storm killed at least two people in California. A significant length of California State Route 1 along the Big Sur collapsed into the ocean after massive amounts of rain were dumped, causing a debris flow onto the highway, which in turn triggered the collapse. In Southern California, the storm triggered widespread flooding and debris flows, forcing the evacuations of thousands of people and also causing widespread property damage. Salinas received  of rainfall for the entire event causing mudflows that forced 7,000 people to evacuate. Blizzard conditions were also recorded on parts of the Sierra Nevada.

Pacific Northwest, 2021 

Heavy rains attributed to a Pineapple Express event heavily impacted the Puget Sound region from Bellingham, Washington into the British Columbia Interior and the Lower Mainland from November 14–15. The resulting floods and ensuing mass wasting events forced the closure of all major Canadian road connections to Vancouver, British Columbia including Highway 1, the Coquihalla, and the Sea to Sky Highway.

California, 2022–2023

Heavy rains attributed to a Pineapple Express caused widespread flooding in the Bay Area.

See also
ARkStorm
Pacific Organized Track System
Siberian Express

References

External links 

 
 
 

Coast of British Columbia
Weather events in North America
West Coast of the United States